The Best Swedish Crime Novel Award (Bästa svenska kriminalroman) is a literary prize awarded annually since 1982 by the Swedish Crime Writers' Academy.

The winners of the award are:

Winners

External links
Swedish Crime Writers' Academy

Mystery and detective fiction awards
Swedish literary awards
1982 establishments in Sweden
Awards established in 1982

sv:Svenska Deckarakademin#Bästa svenska kriminalroman
de:Schwedischer Krimipreis